Selvadius is a genus of amber lady beetles in the family Coccinellidae. There are at least four described species in Selvadius.

Species
These four species belong to the genus Selvadius:
 Selvadius maderi (Nunenmacher, 1937)
 Selvadius megacephalus (Fall, 1901)
 Selvadius nunenmacheri Gordon, 1970
 Selvadius rectus Casey, 1899

References

Further reading

 
 

Coccinellidae
Coccinellidae genera
Articles created by Qbugbot